Jacques Pfister (30 May 1903 – 21 March 1968) was a French racing cyclist. He finished in last place in the 1927 Tour de France.

References

External links

1903 births
1968 deaths
French male cyclists
Place of birth missing